is a fictional character in the Dragon Ball media franchise. Created as part of a collaborative process between Arc System Works and Akira Toriyama, Android 21 makes her debut appearance in the 2018 fighting game Dragon Ball FighterZ published by Bandai Namco Entertainment, where she serves as a main villainess. The character has received 
a very positive reception, and has since appeared in other licensed Dragon Ball video games.

Concept and design
Both the publisher Bandai Namco Entertainment and developer of Dragon Ball FighterZ Arc System Works marketed Android 21 as being created or designed by Akira Toriyama when the character was first unveiled in promotional and marketing material for FighterZ in September 2017. One of the trailers used the wording, "Original character supervised by Akira Toriyama," which was interpreted by Kyle Hilliard from Game Informer as an implication that while Toriyama may not have drawn her for the game, he is involved in her visual direction and conception. The developers later clarified in an interview that they came up with 
the game’s story on their own and created the framework for what kind of character Android 21 would be, while Toriyama designed her within said parameters. The developers sought Toriyama's input as they wanted a slick design for a character that would transform, in the hope that Toriyama's involvement with the game's visuals would generate interest and bring in prospective fans. According to producer Tomoko Hiroki, Toriyama was informed about the game's plot and what the developers wanted in the character, such as her gender and her personality, and he would be left to draw the character as he saw fit. Toriyama took the suggestions about Android 21 into account and finalized her design, but was not involved in any direct input into her story. The game itself was noted by Toriyama to be an official part of the overall Dragon Ball canon.

Arc System Works staff indicated in an interview about the developmental process for Dragon Ball FighterZ that they wanted to create an original story for Dragon Ball FighterZ because the events of the original series have been retread several times by other licensed video games; the introduction of an original villainous character is intended to add a fresh element to the game's story.  Android 21 was concepted to be a Red Ribbon Bio-Android as part of the developer's take on maintaining a connection to the original series' themes while creating something new, and as a female character since the Dragon Ball series have had few female villains throughout its decades-long history, while her ability to shapeshift into an alternate form at will also differentiates her from notable series villain Cell. Her connection to the Red Ribbon Army and its series of Androids created by Doctor Gero was highlighted in media coverage; for example, a trailer showed a cutscene where she assists an injured Android 18, and calls herself a researcher for the Red Ribbon Army. Hiroki indicated that the character is highly intelligent, as emphasized by her lab coat and glasses, possibly more so compared to Doctor Gero. Android 21's ability to transform is derived from a suggestion by Shueisha, the publisher of the Jump magazine line which serializes the Dragon Ball manga.

Abilities
As she possesses the genetic material of various powerful characters in the series much like Cell, Android 21 is depicted as a very formidable being with superhuman strength, endurance, and speed. She is noted to have two forms with distinct personalities, one being her human form, and the other is her true form which is reminiscent of Majin Buu, with a similar pink skin palette and style of clothing.

Android 21 can fly and create energy beams using her ki. Like Buu, Android 21 is capable of transforming objects or living things by shooting an energy beam at the target, typically rendering them as confectionery or other sweet foods to feed her ravenous hunger. She is also capable of copying and emulating the abilities and powers of other characters by stabbing her targets with an energy blade projected from her hand.

Appearances

Within the main story mode for Dragon Ball FighterZ, Android 21 is initially presented as a mysterious scientist who works for the Red Ribbon Army, and is somehow connected to a mysterious anomaly which renders various Dragon Ball series characters powerless, as well as the appearance of hostile cloned versions of series characters. Her backstory and true nature is gradually revealed through the progression of the game's narrative, and is featured as the final boss in each of the game's three story arcs. Android 21 is the central focus of the third and final story arc left in the game's rotation, where she ends up being split into two separate entities: a benevolent one who retains most of Android 21's original personality, and a malevolent one whose sole desire is to consume all life. It is later revealed that she is originally based on a human female, who had a son with Doctor Gero named Gevo, the model for Android 16's design. In another instance, 21 is noted to be a new type of Bio-Android, similar to Cell but superior in power. She is unlocked as a playable character for all game modes once the story mode is completed. A second playable version of Android 21, using her human design and her lab coat attire, was added via downloadable content in February 2022.

Android 21 and the cloned enemy characters from  Dragon Ball FighterZ are featured in the animated opening credits of the Super Dragon Ball Heroes: World Mission update for the Dragon Ball Heroes digital card game, but have yet appeared in the promotional anime itself. Within the Super Dragon Ball Heroes game, she is featured in boss fights which are part of the World Mission subplot. The character's other video game appearances include Dragon Ball Z: Dokkan Battle, Dragon Ball Legends, and as downloadable content for Dragon Ball Xenoverse 2.

In Dragon Ball Z: Kakarot, the player may encounter a character simply known as "Female Researcher", who is identical in appearance to Android 21's human form and her late human base; chronologically, Kakarot is set prior to the events of FighterZ. She serves as a vendor who aids the player characters' training to become stronger.

The 2022 film Dragon Ball Super: Super Hero reveals the name of Android 21's human base to be , still the wife of Dr. Gero. Vomi is briefly sighted during a media presentation by senior members of the reconstituted Red Ribbon Army as they attempt to recruit her surviving grandson, Dr. Hedo.

Promotion and merchandise
Android 21 has been subject to merchandise. Two action figures have been produced, one as part of the Dragonball S.H. Figuarts line, and another by Megahouse as part of their Dragon Ball Gals line, respectively.

Reception
Upon her reveal, Android 21 has received particular attention due to her distinctive visual design by Toriyama. She became a popular subject for cosplay activities by Dragon Ball fandom. Brittany Vincent from Shacknews described her as "a powerhouse of a character" who players will love to defeat their opponents with. Mike Fahey found the story mode for Dragon Ball FighterZ to be surprisingly good, and thought highly of Android 21 as a "delightful new character" who eats the warriors she transforms into snack foods. Chris Moyes from Destructoid said Android 21 is a "femme-fatale scientist" who won over many fans with her debut appearance, praising her "great visual design, complex moveset and mischievous-but-deadly personality", as well as her ability to turn her enemies into desserts as a good party trick. Comicbook.com staff highlighted her status as a female character who can physically compete with the predominantly male cast of characters in the Dragon Ball series. Nick Valdez from Comicbook.com, praised Android 21 for her "great character design", as well as her "compelling story that makes her stand out from other villains in the series". He argued that Android 21 is the one aspect of FighterZ that Dragon Ball fans love "above all else", and that she should be properly introduced into the series canon. Commenting on her appearance in the animated opening credits of World Mission in a April 2018 post, Valdez was of the view that "while this may not be the full anime debut of the character as fans were expecting, it does show how well the character makes the jump to animation".

The second playable version of Android 21 has been met with a divisive response from the fighting game community. Some players criticized the character's gameplay as being unbalanced and claimed that the opportunity to play as the character in competitive matches, particularly in serious tournaments, has led to declining interest and investment in FighterZ from high profile professional players.

References

Anime and manga characters who can move at superhuman speeds
Anime and manga characters with superhuman strength
Anime and manga supervillains
Dragon Ball characters
Cyborg supervillains
Female supervillains
Female video game villains
Fictional characters with energy-manipulation abilities
Fictional characters without a name
Fictional gynoids
Fictional hybrids
Fighting game characters
Shapeshifter characters in video games
Video game bosses
Video game characters introduced in 2018
Video game characters designed by Akira Toriyama
Woman soldier and warrior characters in video games